Jean-Michel Labadie (born 14 July 1974 in Cambo-les-Bains, Basque Country) is a French musician best known as the bassist of metal band Gojira.

Career
Labadie grew up in the Basque Country, and played bass in regional underground bands.

Since 1998, Labadie has been the bassist of the metal band Gojira, which was formed in Ondres (Landes), near Bayonne (Basque Country). The whole band grew up in the south-west of France. 

Labadie is known for his energetic live presence during shows, with much jumping around the stage and heavy headbanging. Of the concerts made with Gojira, Labadie said, "I don't feel like a rock star but just human. I'm looking for my place and I want to give the best of myself, and while I can be useful, I just try to do good to people".

Music
When he was eleven years old, Labadie discovered Metallica. He started playing bass at the age of fifteen; "Fade to Black" was the first song he learned to play. He was also influenced by death metal bands such as Death, Morbid Angel, and Sepultura. He also cited Rage Against the Machine, Slayer and Pantera as influences.

Personal life
Labadie likes landscapes, solitude, nature and adrenaline. He started practicing boardsports such as skateboarding, surfing and snowboarding. In 1996, he became passionate about mountain biking, and found these sensations again, "but more brutal". When he's not touring across the world with Gojira, he practices mountain biking at a high level in his Savoyard mountains, the place where he resides.  Labadie said, "Playing sports helps keep up the pace. For the drummer, too, you have to train. I like to push my body and the adrenaline it gives me".

Equipment
Labadie is known to use a pick to play bass in Gojira. He uses Darkglass electronics when playing live with the band.

Effects

 KHDK Abyss
 Ibanez TS7
 Boss TU3
 MXR Smartgate
 Radial Headbone VT

Bass guitars
Tobias Basic 6 Bass
Fender American Deluxe Precision Bass
Fender American Deluxe Jazz Bass
Fender American Deluxe Dimension Bass
Dingwall Super P Bass

Amplifiers and Cabinets
SWR Amps 
Fender SuperBassman 300 Amp
Darkglass Amps

Discography

Gojira

Demos 
 Saturate (as Godzilla) (1999)
 Wisdom Comes (as Godzilla) (2000)

EPs
 Maciste All'Inferno (Gojira) (2003)
 End of Time (Gojira) (2012)

Studio albums
Terra Incognita (2001)
The Link (2003)
From Mars to Sirius (2005)
The Way of All Flesh (2008)
L'Enfant Sauvage (2012)
Magma (2016)
Fortitude (2021)

References

External links

Death metal musicians
French bass guitarists
Male bass guitarists
Living people
People from Bayonne
Progressive metal bass guitarists
1974 births
21st-century bass guitarists
21st-century French male musicians
Gojira (band) members
French male guitarists